is a film in the nunsploitation subgenre of Pinky violence made by Toei Company in 1974.

Plot
A young woman (Yumi Takigawa) becomes a nun at the Sacred Heart Convent to find out what happened to her mother years earlier. She encounters a lesbian mother superior, lecherous archbishops, and uncovers many dark secrets. The convent also practices brutal discipline and encourages masochistic rituals such as self-flagellation. In one scene, two nuns are forced to strip to the waist and whip each other severely with heavy floggers. Later, Takigawa is tortured and whipped by a group of nuns armed with rose-thorns.

Cast
 Yumi Takigawa as Maya Takigawa
 Emiko Yamauchi as Matsuko Ishida
 Yayoi Watanabe as Hisako Kitano
 Yōko Mihara as Sadako Matsumara
 Fumio Watanabe as Priest Kakinuma

Critical appraisal
Praising the work of writer/director Norifumi Suzuki as well as the leading actors, critic Donald Guarisco of Allmovie says, "This Japanese shocker manages to [be] shocking and artistically stunning all at once."

In TokyoScope: The Japanese Cult Film Companion, Patrick Macias calls the film a "comic adaptation and a blasphemous sermon of high camp and knowing literary intelligence." He continues, "Trashy as it may sound, Suzuki's film is absolutely gorgeous to gaze upon."

Availability
The Cult Epics company released School of the Holy Beast on region-1 DVD on August 30, 2005. The extras on the DVD included the original theatrical trailer, and interviews with lead actress Yumi Takigawa and film critic Risaku Kiridoushi.

Notes

Sources
 
 
 
 
 
 
 
 
 DVD Review at Frankly Mr Shankly

External links 
 
 
 

1974 films
1974 LGBT-related films
Japanese LGBT-related films
Nunsploitation films
Films directed by Norifumi Suzuki
Incest in film
Lesbian-related films
Toei Pinky Violence
Toei Company films
1970s Japanese films